Oreta suffusa is a moth in the family Drepanidae. It was described by Francis Walker in 1855. It is found in Sri Lanka and southern India.

Adults are lilac-fawn colour, the wings with numerous greyish spots, yellowish towards the base and along the exterior border. The forewings have a darker middle part, bounded on the inside by an undulating grey band and on the outside by a more oblique and straight yellow band. There is a blackish spot at the interior angle. The hindwings have a very narrow darker middle part.

References

Moths described in 1855
Drepaninae